Carmen Lim Planas (March 23, 1914 – August 25, 1964) was the first woman to be elected to any public office in the Philippines when she was elected councilor of Manila by general suffrage in 1934. She would later serve as the capital city's First (1st) Female Vice Mayor of Manila  from 1940 to 1941 and again from 1944 to 1951.

Formative years
Carmen Planas was born on March 23, 1914, in Tondo, Manila, to Illuminado Planas and Concepcion Lim. Her siblings include attorney Charito Lim Planas (a former vice mayor of Quezon City), socialite Adela Planas-Paterno (former Miss Visayas), and businessman Severino L. Planas. She was a consistent class valedictorian from grade school through college. 

At Zaragosa Elementary School, she was top pupil in her fourth grade. In the seventh grade, she transferred to Collegia de Sta. Rosa where she was also a top student. She attended high school at the Holy Ghost College (now known as the Holy Spirit College).

She enrolled in the prelaw course at the University of the Philippines, where she became a scholar. Her oratical and debating ability and zeal earned her gold medals in the U.P. College of Law. 

Once her debating ability was tested on the issue of women suffrage. She was assigned to take the affirmative side, and advocated it brilliantly. Then she was assigned to argue the negative side on the same issue, she defended it with even more convincing eloquence. This display of rare talent earned her two medals. She also won the Spanish declamation contest.

Political career

During the height of the Cuervo-Barredo case, Planas made an eloquent and impassioned speech in front of a youth rally, criticizing Commonwealth President Manuel Quezon's interference in the judiciary. The following day she appeared on the front pages of the metropolitan papers with the headline "U.P. COED ATTACKS QUEZON." She was summoned by Malacañang and asked why she lambasted the president. She replied that she was only criticizing what the president had done.

After the incident, Wenceslao Vinzons, who was the leader of the Young Philippines Party, nominated her to be their party candidate for the city council of Manila. Later, she became the first woman elected to the city council.

Planas was nicknamed "Manila's Darling" and "Manila's Sweetheart" by her constituents. This was due to an incident when she was hurrying out of the office to an appointment, bypassing a reporter who had been hoping to interview her. The reporter jokingly asked if she was on her way to a date. Without missing a beat, she replied that her date was with the City of Manila.

Social works

When World War II came to the Philippines, Planas did not stop serving her fellows. She did some undercover work, rendered exemplary service to the guerillas. She was always seen bringing food and other forms of aid to hospitals and to the homes of the injured ex-servicemen. After the war, she served in various positions in the government. She became the governor and secretary of the Philippine National Red Cross, legal adviser to the Philippine Association of Women Doctors, the Filipino Youth Symphony Organization, and the Women's International League.

In recognition of her excellent work, she was sent by the Philippine National Red Cross as the lone delegate to the convention of Red Cross governors in Oslo, Norway. She was also the Philippines Lawyers Association delegate to the Lawyers International Conference in Monte Carlo, Monaco.

Death and legacy
She died at the Grant Hospital in Chicago, Illinois, on August 25, 1964, at the age of 50. Planas had devoted her life to public service, and was never married. She had a simple philosophy in life:"I just do the best I can in any given problem. The results I leave to God who must have a reason for everything that happens." A street in Tondo, Manila, was renamed after her.

References 

|-

1914 births
1964 deaths
Manila City Council members
People from Manila
University of the Philippines alumni
Filipino women lawyers
20th-century Filipino lawyers
Burials at the Manila North Cemetery
20th-century Filipino women politicians
20th-century Filipino politicians
Filipino beauty pageant winners
20th-century women lawyers